W. G. Grace played mostly for Gloucestershire County Cricket Club and Marylebone Cricket Club (MCC) during the five seasons from 1887 to 1891. He also represented England in Test cricket.

1892 English cricket season

Grace rallied somewhat during the next three seasons, despite continuing problems at Gloucestershire.

Grace made 21 first-class appearances in 1892, scoring 1,055 runs, with a highest score of 99, at an average of 31.02 with 0 centuries and 8 half-centuries. In the field, he took 14 catches and 31 wickets with a best analysis of 5–51. His bowling average was 30.90; he had 5 wickets in an innings twice.

1893 English cricket season

Grace made 28 first-class appearances in 1893, scoring 1,609 runs, with a highest score of 128, at an average of 35.75 with 1 century and 11 half-centuries. In the field, he took 21 catches and 22 wickets with a best analysis of 4–95. His bowling average was 38.81.

1894 English cricket season

Grace made 27 first-class appearances in 1894, scoring 1,293 runs, with a highest score of 196, at an average of 29.38 with 3 centuries and 5 half-centuries. In the field, he took 18 catches and 29 wickets with a best analysis of 6–82. His bowling average was 25.24; he had 5 wickets in an innings once.

References

External links
 CricketArchive – W.G. Grace

Bibliography

 
 
 
 
 
 
 
 
 

English cricket seasons in the 19th century
1892